The 2019–20 Women's EHF Champions League was the 27th edition of the Women's EHF Champions League, the competition for top women's clubs of Europe, organized and supervised by the European Handball Federation.

Győri Audi ETO KC were the defending champions.

Because of the Coronavirus pandemic, the quarterfinals matches which normally start in early April, were postponed to mid-June, then moved to September and were later cancelled. The final four was first moved from May to September and later cancelled.

Format
16 teams were participating in the competition, divided in four groups who played in a round robin, home and away format. The top three teams in each group qualified for the main round.

Main round
The 12 qualified teams were divided in two groups who played in a round robin, home and away format. The points and the goal difference gained against the qualified teams in the first round were carried over. The top four teams in each group qualified for the quarterfinals.

Knockout stage
After the quarterfinals, the culmination of the season, the Women's EHF Final four, would continue in its existing format, with the four top teams from the competition competing for the title.

Team allocation
16 national champions applied for the 27th season based on the EHF ranking list, while further eight teams eligible to play in the Women's EHF Cup have requested an upgrade for the EHF Champions League. Registration of clubs does not equal participation, and the final list of all participants was confirmed by the EHF Executive Committee on Friday 21 June.
15 teams are directly qualified for the group stage.

Round and draw dates
The hosting rights for the qualification tournament were drawn on 26 June 2019 and the group stage draw on 27 June 2019 in Vienna, Austria.

Qualification stage

The four teams played a semifinal and final to determine the last participant for the group stage. The hosting rights for the qualification tournament were drawn on 26 June 2019. The winner of the qualification tournament advanced to the group stage.

Qualification tournament

Group stage

The draw was held on 27 June 2019. In each group, teams played against each other in a double round-robin format, with home and away matches. The top three teams advanced to the main round.

Group A

Group B

Group C

Group D

Main round

In each group, teams played against each other in a double round-robin format, with home and away matches. Points against teams from the same group were carried over.

Group 1

Group 2

Knockout stage

On 26 June 2020, EHF announced that the knockout stage, including the quarterfinals and the Final 4 were cancelled due to the COVID-19 pandemic.

Quarterfinals
The European Handball Federation announced on 13 March 2020 that the quarter-finals matches will not be held as scheduled due to the ongoing developments in the spread of COVID-19 across Europe. The matches were rescheduled on 25 March. The matches were cancelled on 24 April 2020.

|}

Awards and statistics

All-Star Team
The all-star team and awards were announced on 5 June 2020.

Goalkeeper:  (Győri Audi ETO KC)
Right wing:  (Budućnost)
Right back:  (Rostov-Don)
Centre back:  (Győri Audi ETO KC)
Left back:  (CSM București)
Left wing:  (Team Esbjerg)
Pivot:  (SCM Râmnicu Vâlcea)

Other awards
Best coach:  (Metz Handball)
Best young player:  (FTC-Rail Cargo Hungaria)
Best defence player:  (Győri Audi ETO KC)

Top goalscorers

References

External links
Official website

 
2019
2019 in European sport
2020 in European sport
2019 in women's handball
2020 in women's handball
Sports events curtailed and voided due to the COVID-19 pandemic